Elections to Langbaurgh Borough Council took place in May 1983. The whole council was up for election and The Labour Party won 31 seats giving it continued overall control of the council.

Election result

Ward Results

Bankside

Belmont

Brotton

Church Lane

Coatham

Dormanstown

Eston

Grangetown

Guisborough

Hutton

Kirkleatham

Lockwood

Loftus

Longbeck

Newcomen

Normanby

Ormesby

Overfields

Redcar

Saltburn

Skelton

Skinningrove

South Bank

St. Germains

Teesville

West Dyke

References

1983 English local elections
1983
1980s in North Yorkshire